The 1937 World Table Tennis Championships were held in Baden bei Wien from February 1 to February 7, 1937.

Medalists

Team

Individual

References

External links
ITTF Museum

 
World Table Tennis Championships
World Table Tennis Championships
World Table Tennis Championships
Table tennis competitions in Austria
International sports competitions hosted by Austria